Hesselbein is a surname. Notable people with the surname include:

Dianne Hesselbein (born 1971), American politician
Frances Hesselbein (1915–2022), American writer and management consultant